Yevgenia Andreyevna Dyupina (born 30 June 1994) is a Russian ice hockey player for HC Dinamo Saint Petersburg and the Russian national team. She participated at the 2015 IIHF Women's World Championship.

References

External links

1994 births
Living people
People from Glazov
Russian women's ice hockey forwards
Universiade medalists in ice hockey
Ice hockey players at the 2018 Winter Olympics
Olympic ice hockey players of Russia
Universiade gold medalists for Russia
Universiade silver medalists for Russia
Competitors at the 2013 Winter Universiade
Competitors at the 2015 Winter Universiade
Competitors at the 2017 Winter Universiade
Competitors at the 2019 Winter Universiade
Sportspeople from Udmurtia